Peter Sivák (born 21 March 1982) is a Slovak professional ice hockey forward currently playing for the Tulsa Oilers of the ECHL.  He previously played with HC Zlín in the Czech Extraliga during the 2010–11 Czech Extraliga season.

Playing career
Sivák became the scorer of one of the fastest goals in hockey history. When playing for MsHK Žilina in the 2011–12 season of the 39th round of top slovak league against HK Poprad, he opened the scoring  in the fifth second. The re-measurement of that time upon review through the video recording, showed that he scored in 3:23 seconds. The longer time he received in the game was apparently the human factor by stopping the clock later by timekeeper. The similar fast goal he scored in the same season in the playoffs in the quarterfinals against Slovan Bratislava where, in 4th game and in 2nd period, he scored the goal in the fifth second.

On 18 September 2013, he was signed as a free agent by the Alaska Aces of the ECHL. In the 2013–14 season, Sivak enjoyed a career best season in leading the Aces with 83 points in 67 games. He was selected to the ECHL's First All-Star Team and was recognized as the ECHL performer of the year in helping the Aces claim the Kelly Cup.

On 22 August 2014, the Bridgeport Sound Tigers of the AHL announced that they had signed Sivák as an unrestricted free agent to a one-year contract. In the 2014–15 season, Sivák was initially reassigned to the Stockton Thunder before he was recalled to feature in just 6 games with the Sound Tigers. He was later reassigned to the Orlando Solar Bears before his AHL rights were traded by the Sound Tigers to the Bears AHL affiliate, the Toronto Marlies on 20 February 2015. He remained with the Solar Bears to conclude the season with 20 points in 25 games.

On 15 July 2015, Sivák was signed as a free agent to remain in the ECHL, agreeing to a one-year contract with the Fort Wayne Komets. He opened the 2015-16 season, scoring 2 goals and 8 points in 10 games with the Komets before he was sidelined by injury. Upon his return to health, Sivák was traded by the Komets in a return to the Alaska Aces in exchange for Joe Perry on 3 December 2015.

With the Alaska Aces ceasing operations following the 2016–17 season, Sivak signed as a free agent to continue in the ECHL with the Utah Grizzlies on August 8, 2017.

Career statistics

Awards and honours

References

External links

1982 births
Abbotsford Heat players
Alaska Aces (ECHL) players
Bridgeport Sound Tigers players
Fort Wayne Komets players
Living people
Orlando Solar Bears (ECHL) players
Rapid City Rush players
San Diego Gulls (AHL) players
San Francisco Bulls players
Stockton Thunder players
Tulsa Oilers (1992–present) players
Utah Grizzlies (ECHL) players
Worcester Sharks players
MsHK Žilina players
PSG Berani Zlín players
HKM Zvolen players
Slovak ice hockey forwards
People from Cheb
Sportspeople from the Karlovy Vary Region
Slovak expatriate ice hockey players in Canada
Slovak expatriate ice hockey players in the United States
Slovak expatriate ice hockey players in the Czech Republic